Lost at Sea is a 1926 American silent drama film directed by Louis J. Gasnier and starring Lowell Sherman. It was produced and released by the Tiffany Productions.

Cast
Huntley Gordon as Richard Lane
Lowell Sherman as Norman Travers
Jane Novak as Natalie Travers
Natalie Kingston as Nita Howard
Billy Kent Schaefer as Bobby Travers
Joan Standing as Olga
Will Walling as Chief of Detectives (credited as William Walling)
Neal Dodd as Reverend Atkinson (credited as Rev. Neal Dodd)

Preservation
With no prints of Lost at Sea located in any film archives, it is a lost film.

References

External links

1926 films
American silent feature films
Lost American films
Films directed by Louis J. Gasnier
Tiffany Pictures films
American black-and-white films
Films based on short fiction
Silent American drama films
1926 drama films
1926 lost films
1920s American films